Kent Alexander Ekeroth (born 11 September 1981) is a Swedish politician and economist, who represented the Sweden Democrats.

Early life
Ekeroth was born in Malmö to a Jewish mother, Janina Kazarina, originally from Kazakhstan in Central Asia (which was then part of the Soviet Union), who arrived as a refugee from Poland to Sweden in the 1970s, together with her mother, Ekeroth's grandmother and sisters. He is of Jewish descent, with an atheistic life stance. Ekeroth studied economics at Lund University.

In a National Swedish Radio interview, Ekeroth traced the origins of his political views to his school days, where he went to what he says was an immigrant-dominated class in Halmstad, where he was bullied by "groups of immigrants from Africa and the Middle East" and connected his experience to the overall immigration problems.

Journalist and author Gellert Tamas claimed that the majority of the class apparently had a Swedish background. According to Tamas, the immigrant-background minority, including Ekeroth, who is of Central Asian Jewish descent, had their background in Eastern Europe. Other students from his time at Östergårdsskolan in Halmstad have said in interviews that Ekeroth was "a quiet, shy kid" and claim he was heavily bullied by his class and "perhaps the entire school".

Political career

Ekeroth joined the Sweden Democrats in 2006. Since 2007, he was the party's secretary for international affairs. He participated in an international counter-jihad conference, and was "deeply involved" in the counter-jihad movement. He has been the member of the Riksdag since 4 October 2010 after being elected in the general election the same year. Ekeroth represented the Stockholm County constituency. In parliament, he has been a member of the Committee on Justice and a deputy member of Committee on European Union Affairs. Ekeroth was a board member of the pan-European eurosceptic European Alliance for Freedom.

In October 2006, Ekeroth was fired from his internship at the Swedish embassy in Tel Aviv, Israel, after the embassy had found out about his involvement with the Sweden Democrats. The embassy's actions were later criticised by the Swedish Chancellor of Justice, Göran Lambertz, who ruled that the firing was illegal and a breach of the Swedish constitutional laws. The Swedish Ministry for Foreign Affairs, who are responsible for all Swedish embassies abroad, also had to pay damages to Ekeroth.

In February 2018, the head of the Sweden Democrats election committee, Michael Rosenberg, confirmed that Ekeroth would not be on the party's proposed list of candidates for the parliament in the next elections. In the same month, Ekeroth delivered a speech, partly in Hungarian, which was highly critical of Sweden, in the Swedish Parliament. Ekeroth has also hinted at plans of moving to Hungary, following in the footsteps of brother and former politician Ted Ekeroth.

Iron pipe scandal
In November 2012, Ekeroth took a break from his duties after the leakage of a video filmed with his mobile phone from an event which became known as the Iron pipe scandal. Erik Almqvist had two years earlier published an edited version of the video to show how he and his party colleagues Ekeroth and Christian Westling had been verbally abused that evening. The film released in November 2012 by Expressen showed Ekeroth and his colleagues arming themselves with iron pipes after arguing with a drunken man. Ekeroth argued with a young woman, whom he allegedly pushed against a car, while he can be heard telling her: "Back off! Back off!". Almqvist used racist and sexist remarks without Ekeroth reacting against it.

The police came to the place and the drunken man said that he saw Ekeroth pushing the woman. Ekeroth and his colleagues had returned when they heard the sirens and said to the police that they had been threatened by the man. While Almqvist was forced to resign, Ekeroth remained in the parliament. Social Democratic Party and chairman of the Committee on Justice, Morgan Johansson was quoted as saying "I wonder what his constituents will think of him being in the Riksdag and getting paid without any real duties".

Ekeroth later invoiced the Swedish newspapers who used the film or stills from the event. For example, Svenska Dagbladet received an invoice of 51,725 Swedish kronor (approximately €5,500).

Media career
Ekeroth has denied editorial involvement in the news website Avpixlat, though he has been in communication with the editorial staff via emails and the site uses his personal bank account to manage its finances. Avpixlat has been called a "hate site", for what are claimed to be expressions of violence and xenophobia. Ekeroth has also denied publishing any articles at the news website, but was quickly found to have published articles as recently as one month before his denial. The tax authorities also found him legally obliged to pay taxes on those donations to Avpixlat, of which 70,000 Swedish kronor had immediately been further transferred to other private accounts owned by Ekeroth.

As Avpixlat has been discontinued, Ekeroth has moved on to register the website Samhällsnytt in his name, and operate it, along with chief editor Tommy Carlsson, former Sweden Democrats politician Erik Almqvist, Russian-born journalist "Egor Putilov" (a pseudonym for Alexander Yarovenko, currently known as Martin Dahlin), and others associated with Sweden Democrats.

Personal life
Ekeroth resides in Budapest, Hungary, having moved there in March 2018.

Assault and verdict
On 24 November 2016, Ekeroth was reported to the police for assault after an incident involving a 20-year-old male. The alleged victim claims that he made a sarcastic comment relating to the "Iron pipe scandal" towards the politician before being punched by Ekeroth. Ekeroth argued self-defense while witnesses from the queue alleged that no punches were thrown at Ekeroth by the victim or anyone else. Prior to the incident, Ekeroth had twice been denied entry to the nightclub in question, Solidaritet at Stureplan in Stockholm. The club's bouncers claim that Ekeroth was highly intoxicated and was acting aggressively at the time. According to club management, Ekeroth was denied entry to the club as they could not guarantee his and other patrons safety, due to the politician's highly intoxicated state, while Ekeroth claims that he was denied entry due to his political views and also that he was attacked one month earlier on his way from work.

On 3 February 2017, following the conclusion of the investigation, the prosecutor filed charges for assault. In June 2017, Ekeroth was found guilty of assault by the court found Ekeroth and he was sentenced to pay a fine. The Svea Court of Appeal later overturned the verdict on the grounds that the prosecutor had failed to disprove that Ekeroth acted in self-defence.

Ekeroth has previously been involved in bar and club incidents, both as an attacker and a victim.

References

External links

Kent Ekeroth at the Swedish Parliament

1981 births
Living people
People from Lund
Members of the Riksdag 2010–2014
Members of the Riksdag 2014–2018
Members of the Riksdag from the Sweden Democrats
Swedish bloggers
Swedish people of Jewish descent
Jewish Swedish politicians
Jewish atheists
Swedish atheists
Lund University alumni
Swedish twins
Counter-jihad activists